Eduardo Alcide "Dudu" Barrichello (born 23 September 2001) is a Brazilian racing driver. He made his kart racing debut in 2013 at the age of 11. In 2018, he started a career in professional motorsport competing in the Formula 4 United States Championship. Barrichello was runner-up in the U.S. F2000 National Championship in the 2020 season.

Early and personal life 
Eduardo Alcide Barrichello was born in São Paulo on 23 September 2001. He is the son of former Formula One driver Rubens Barrichello and Silvana Giaffone Alcide, a cousin of the racing drivers Affonso and Felipe Giaffone.

Karting record

Karting career summary

Racing record

Racing career summary 

† As Barrichello was a guest driver, he was ineligible to score points.
* Season still in progress.

Complete Formula 4 United States Championship results

Complete U.S. F2000 National Championship results

Complete NACAM Formula 4 Championship results 
(key) (Races in bold indicate pole position) (Races in italics indicate fastest lap)

Complete Formula Regional European Championship results 
(key) (Races in bold indicate pole position) (Races in italics indicate fastest lap)

* Season still in progress.

References

External links
 

U.S. F2000 National Championship drivers
Racing drivers from São Paulo
Brazilian racing drivers
2001 births
Living people
Formula Regional European Championship drivers
Stock Car Brasil drivers
JD Motorsport drivers
Arden International drivers
Toyota Gazoo Racing drivers
United States F4 Championship drivers
NACAM F4 Championship drivers